Abdul Mannan Choudhury (born 1 January 1948) is a Bangladeshi academic, educationist and freedom fighter of the liberation war 1971 of Bangladesh. As of September 2018 he is the Vice-Chancellor of the World University of Bangladesh. He was formerly a professor and a selection grade professor at the University of Dhaka.

Education
Choudhury was born in Comilla District of Bangladesh. He completed his PhD from London, his MBA from Manchester Business School and Master of Commerce from the Dhaka University.

Career

Academic
Choudhury served as the head of the department, academic dean and syndicate member at Bayero University in Nigeria. As associate professor he joined Dhaka University in 1978. He was the proctor of University of Dhaka from 1987 to 1989. From 1989 to 1992 he was Professor of Management, Dhaka University. In 1992 he was promoted as a Selection Grade Professor of Management. On 12 April 2005 Dhaka University authority appointed Choudhury as a first chairman of Department of Management Information Systems (MIS). From 2005 to 2012 he served as a Selection Grade Professor in the Department of Management Information Systems (MIS), Dhaka University.

He served as chairperson of Department of Management, University of Dhaka from 1992 to 1995. He was the founder chairman of National Institute of Business Administration & Information Science (2000) and Institute of Business Administration & Information Systems (1998).

He was the founder director of Evening MBA Program, Department of Management Studies, University of Dhaka. From 2007 to 2010 he was the Vice Chancellor of World University of Bangladesh. In 2012 he joined again as the Vice Chancellor of World University of Bangladesh and up to this present time he is holding the same position.

Administrative
Choudhury was elected as the president of National Management Association in 1996. He was formerly the director of Bangladesh Commerce Bank Ltd in 1998. He was a member of Finance Committee, University of Dhaka (1998-1999), National Board of Drugs and Narcotics, Ministry of Home Affairs, Government of Bangladesh (1999), Prison Reforms Committee, Ministry of Social Welfare and Government of Bangladesh (1998). He is a life member of Manchester Business School Association, Association of British Council Scholars and National Management Association of Bangladesh and many other socio-cultural organizations.

Contribution in Bangladesh Liberation War
Choudhury was a part of the history of Bangladesh Liberation War 1971. He was a freedom fighter and he took part in several movements related to Bangladesh Liberation War. He was an advisor of National Council for Freedom Fighters.

References

Living people
Bangladeshi academic administrators
Academic staff of the University of Dhaka
Honorary Fellows of Bangla Academy
People from Comilla District
1948 births
University of Dhaka alumni
Alumni of the University of London
Academic staff of Bayero University Kano
Alumni of the Manchester Business School